Kemal Gözükara (born 1928 in the village of  Eldelek in the district of Elbistan in the Turkish Province Kahramanmaraş) is a mathematician and businessman, and is also a benefactor and president of the Istanbul Arel University.

Life and work 
Kemal Gözükara was born in 1928 in Edelek attended the Duezici school in Adana. Thereafter he qualified from the Department of Science of Gazi University. He then worked for five years as a mathematician at the Mükremin-Halil Gymnasium in Elbistan and did military service, after which he became a teacher at the İzzet-Ünver Gymnasium in Bahçelievler, Istanbul.

In 1974 Gözükara decided to give up teaching and to go into industry. With financial support from his father he built up a successful firm for the export of leather clothes within four years. He then entered the building trade and founded Arel Construction Industry and Trade.

With the fund Kemal Gözükara Education and Culture Foundation he set up the financial prerequisites necessary for the founding of the Istanbul Arel Üniversitesi, which has been officially recognised since 2007. He has worked closely with Enver Duran and Hilmi Ibar as well as with the Balkan Universities Network.

His son Özgür Gözükara (* 1976) ist Chairman of the Board of Trustees of Arel University.

References

External links 
Web Pages of Istanbul Arel Üniversitesi (Turkish, English)

Living people
Turkish academics
1928 births